The canton of Pont-l'Évêque is an administrative division of the Calvados department, northwestern France. Its borders were modified at the French canton reorganisation which came into effect in March 2015. Its seat is in Pont-l'Évêque.

Composition

It consists of the following communes:

 Les Authieux-sur-Calonne
 Beaumont-en-Auge
 Benerville-sur-Mer
 Blangy-le-Château
 Blonville-sur-Mer
 Bonneville-la-Louvet
 Bonneville-sur-Touques
 Le Breuil-en-Auge
 Le Brévedent
 Canapville
 Clarbec
 Coquainvilliers
 Englesqueville-en-Auge
 Fauguernon
 Le Faulq
 Fierville-les-Parcs
 Firfol
 Fumichon
 Glanville
 Hermival-les-Vaux
 Manneville-la-Pipard
 Le Mesnil-sur-Blangy
 Moyaux
 Norolles
 Ouilly-du-Houley
 Ouilly-le-Vicomte
 Pierrefitte-en-Auge
 Le Pin
 Pont-l'Évêque
 Reux
 Rocques
 Saint-André-d'Hébertot
 Saint-Arnoult
 Saint-Benoît-d'Hébertot
 Saint-Étienne-la-Thillaye
 Saint-Hymer
 Saint-Julien-sur-Calonne
 Saint-Martin-aux-Chartrains
 Saint-Philbert-des-Champs
 Saint-Pierre-Azif
 Surville
 Le Torquesne
 Tourgéville
 Tourville-en-Auge
 Vauville
 Vieux-Bourg
 Villers-sur-Mer

Councillors

Pictures of the canton

References

Cantons of Calvados (department)